The Christian Brothers Cadets men's soccer team was a varsity college soccer team that represented the Christian Brothers College (now a high school) from the 1870s until the 1910s.

The team is best known for being one of the most dominant pre-regulation college soccer programs in the United States, retroactively winning ASHA and IFRA pre-regulation national championships. In total, the Cadets won 16 consecutive national championships between 1890 and 1905. The 1905 title was shared with Haverford College by the Intercollegiate Soccer Football League, which was the governing body of college soccer in the United States from 1904 until 1958 (the NCAA began governing college soccer in 1959).

Since at least the 1930s the program was downgraded to a high school boys' school program, where they would win 9 state championships in Missouri.

Honors 
ASHA/IFRA National Champions (15): 1890, 1891, 1892, 1893, 1894, 1895, 1896, 1897, 1898, 1899, 1900, 1901, 1902, 1903, 1904
ISFL National co-champions (1): 1905
Summer Olympics Silver Medal: 1904

See also 
 1904–05 Christian Brothers Cadets men's soccer team

References 

 
Defunct soccer clubs in Missouri
1870 establishments in Missouri
1930 disestablishments in Missouri
Association football clubs disestablished in 1930
Association football clubs established in 1870